Roxbourne was a hamlet in the London Borough of Harrow west of Rayners Lane in the north west of 
Greater London (Historically in the county of Middlesex). 
It includes the Yeading Brook and Roxbourne Park  
which provides 26 hectares of open space including football and cricket facilities; the Roxbourne Rough Nature Reserve, enriched with wildlife; and the Roxbourne (miniature) Railway.

Social Structure
The first census in 1801 simply divided people into those employed in agriculture and those in trade or manufacturing, and the 1841 census, the first to gather 
detailed occupational data, imposed no real order on it at all. However, the first occupational classification, introduced in 1851, was clearly concerned with social 
status as well as with what people made: it began with the Queen, followed by government officials and then by 'the learned professions'.

References

External links
 Roxbourne Middle School
 Roxbourne Infant School

Districts of the London Borough of Harrow
Areas of London